Listed below are the dates and results for the 2002 FIFA World Cup qualification rounds for the Oceanian zone (OFC). For an overview of the qualification rounds, see the article 2002 FIFA World Cup qualification.

Papua New Guinea chose not to participate.

A total of 10 teams entered the competition. The Oceanian zone was allocated 0.5 places (out of 32) in the final tournament.

Format
There would be two rounds of play:
 First Round: The 10 teams were divided into two groups of five teams each. The teams played against each other once. The group winners would advance to the Final Round.
 Second Round: The two teams played against each other on a home-and-away basis. The winner would advance to the CONMEBOL/OFC Intercontinental Play-off.

Australia's 31–0 win over American Samoa established a World Cup record for the highest margin of victory in a qualifying match.

First round

Group 1 

Australia advanced to the Final Round.

Group 2 

New Zealand advanced to the Final Round.

Second round 

|}

Australia advanced to the CONMEBOL / OFC Intercontinental Play-off by the aggregate score of 6–1.

Inter-confederation play-off

Did not enter

Goalscorers
There were 180 goals scored in 24 matches (including 2 international play-offs), for an average of 7.5 goals per match.
16 goals

 Archie Thompson

14 goals

 David Zdrilic

9 goals

 Esala Masi
 Vaughan Coveny

7 goals

 John Aloisi

5 goals

 Kevin Muscat
 Tony Popovic
 Shailemdra Lal
 Commins Menapi
 Richard Iwai

4 goals

 Con Boutsianis
 Damian Mori
 Aurelio Vidmar
 Desmond Fa'aiuaso
 Naea Bennett
 Felix Tagawa
 Lokoua Taufahema

3 goals

 Scott Chipperfield
 Brett Emerton
 Chris Jackson
 Ben Lemana
 Patteson Daudau
 Batram Suri
 Tony Senechal

2 goals

 Simon Colosimo
 Hayden Foxe
 Manoa Masi
 Valerio Nasema
 Atnesh Prasad
 Abinesh Samy
 Noah Hickey
 Aaran Lines
 Vivian Wickham
 Simon Lauru

1 goal

 Fausto De Amicis
 Steve Corica
 Tony Vidmar
 Junior Pukoku
 Niki Temiha
 Jope Namawa Leka
 Ulaiasi Mateiwai
 Ul Radike Mateiwai
 Leone Vurukania
 Mark Burton
 Jonathan Perry
 Paul Urlovic
 Ivan Vicelich
 Dominic Gabriel
 Junior Michael
 David Firisua
 Joel Konofilla
 Jack Samani
 Stanley Waita
 Harold Amaru
 Samuel Garcia
 Steve Fatupua-Lecaill
 Teu Fakava
 Penieli Moa
 Fillisione Taufahema
 Jimmy Ben
 Gerard Maki
 Pita Maki
 Waren Waiwai

1 own goal

 Lisi Leututu (playing against Samoa)
 Filipo Bureta (playing against Australia)
 Molesi Tokuma (playing against Fiji)

See also 
 Tonga 0–22 Australia
 Australia 31–0 American Samoa

References

 
OFC
2002
International association football competitions hosted by Australia
International association football competitions hosted by New Zealand
Fifa World Cup Qualification (ofc), 2002
qual

fr:Tours préliminaires à la Coupe du monde de football 2002#Océanie
lt:XVII pasaulio futbolo čempionato atranka#Okeanija